HMS G13 was a British G-class submarine built for the Royal Navy during World War I.

Description
The G-class submarines were designed by the Admiralty in response to a rumour that the Germans were building double-hulled submarines for overseas duties. They displaced  on the surface and  submerged. The G-class submarines had a crew of 30 officers and ratings. They had a partial double hull.

For surface running, the boats were powered by two  Vickers two-stroke diesel engines, each driving one propeller shaft. When submerged each propeller was driven by a  electric motor. They could reach  on the surface and  underwater.

The boats were intended to be armed with one 21-inch (53.3 cm) torpedo tube in the bow and two 18-inch (45 cm) torpedo tubes on the beam. This was revised, however, while they were under construction, the 21-inch tube was moved to the stern and two additional 18-inch tubes were added in the bow. They carried two 21-inch and eight 18-inch torpedoes. The G-class submarines were also armed with a single  deck gun.

War service
Like the rest of her class, G13s role was to patrol an area of the North Sea in search of German U-boats. On 10 March 1917 G13 torpedoed and sank the German submarine UC-43 off the Shetland Islands, about  NW of Muckle Flugga Lighthouse. Lieutenant Commander George Fagan Bradshaw was awarded the Distinguished Service Order for his command in this action.

G13 survived the war and was sold for scrap in 1923.

Notes

References
 
 
 

 

British G-class submarines
World War I submarines of the United Kingdom
Ships built in Barrow-in-Furness
Royal Navy ship names
1916 ships